Mesolimax is a genus of gastropods belonging to the family Agriolimacidae.

The species of this genus are found in Aegean Sea.

Species:

Mesolimax brauni 
Mesolimax escherichi

References

Agriolimacidae